Elad I. Levy is an American neurosurgeon, researcher, and innovator who played a major role in the development and testing of thrombectomy, which improved quality of life and survival of stroke patients. He has focused his career and research on developing evidence based medicine and literature showing the benefits of thrombectomy for the treatment of stroke. He is currently Professor of Neurosurgery and Radiology, and the L. Nelson Hopkins, MD Professor Endowed Chair of the Department of Neurosurgery at the State University of New York at Buffalo (SUNY).

In 2011 Levy founded and is currently the president for the Program for Understanding Childhood Concussion & Stroke (PUCCS), to date this organization has raised over $750,000 which is aimed towards promoting research and preventing concussions in all sports. In addition Levy is co-chair of CycleNation for the American Heart Association raising over $500,000 geared towards prevention and education of stroke and heart disease.  In 2013 he became the unaffiliated National Football League (NFL) Neurotrauma consultant for the Buffalo Bills. In 2017 he was appointed as one of 12 National Directors to the American Board of Neurological Surgeons. In 2018 he was appointed Secretary to the Congress of Neurological Surgeons Executive Committee  and also appointed to the Ethics Committee for the American Association of Neurological Surgeons. He is also the Director of Stroke Research and Director of Endovascular Stroke Treatment and Research at the Department of Neurosurgery, SUNY at Buffalo, co-director of Kaleida Health Stroke Center at the Gates Vascular Institute, and co-director of Cerebrovascular Surgery at the Department of Neurosurgery, SUNY at Buffalo. In 2020 Levy received his appointment as Distinguished Professor at the State University of New York at Buffalo due to his prolific contributions to research, innovation, leadership and academia. In October 2021, Dr. Levy was appointed new president-elect for the Congress of Neurological Surgeons Dr. Levy also served as the neurosurgery consultant for season 2 and season 3 of popular TV show Grey's Anatomy.

Early life and education

Levy was born in Tiberias, Israel in 1972. His father went to medical school in Italy, where Dr. Levy learned to speak Italian, in addition to English in school and Hebrew at home. At the age of seven, he immigrated to the United States. After his father's residency training in obstetrics and gynecology in New York City, his family settled in rural northern upstate New York close to Montreal, where his dad joined a solo Obstetrics and gynecology practice. Growing up, Levy spent his summers with his father's family in Israel. Dr. Levy went onto attend local schools before his last two years of High School, which he spent at Choate Rosemary Hall, a private boarding school in Wallingford, Connecticut.

Higher education and training
Levy went to Dartmouth College to study molecular biology and biochemistry. He began medical school in 1993 at The George Washington University School of Medicine & Health Sciences in Washington, D.C., where he became interested in Orthopedic Surgery. However, when he did not secure the summer orthopedic internship after his freshman year, he chose to do a summer research project with Dr. Laligam Sekhar, the Chairman of Neurosurgery at George Washington University at the time, since then neurosurgery became his focus.

Following graduation in 1997, Levy began his surgical internships and training in neurosurgery at the University of Pittsburgh . Following in the footsteps of Dr. Peter Jannetta, the "father of microvascular decompression," and Dr. Dade Lunsford, who introduced Gamma-knife radiosurgery to the University of Pittsburgh, Levy pursued minimally invasive endovascular neurosurgery by spending 2 years of his residency in Buffalo, as a fellow under Dr. L. Nelson Hopkins, the "father of neurointerventional surgery". He completed his fellowship training in 2003 and returned to Pittsburgh to finish his residency training in 2004.

In later years, Levy also completed his Master of Business Administration at Northeastern University and graduated magna cum laude in 2013.

Academic and professional career

Levy started his academic and professional career as an associate professor of neurosurgery and radiology at the State University of New York (SUNY) at Buffalo in 2004. The following year in 2005, he became the Director for Stroke Research, and co-director of Cerebrovascular Surgery at the Department of Neurosurgery, SUNY at Buffalo. He was also appointed as co-director of Kaleida Health Stroke Center and the Director of Endovascular Stroke Treatment and Research in 2006. He also served as the Endovascular Fellowship Program Director for the Department of Neurosurgery, SUNY at Buffalo from 2006 to 2013.

In 2010, Levy was promoted to the title of Professor of Neurosurgery and Radiology. Subsequently, in 2013 when Dr. L. Nelson Hopkins retired as the Chair of Neurosurgery, Levy became chairman. Since then he more than doubled the size of the faculty

Selected awards and recognitions

  2022-2023: President of the Congress of Neurological Surgeons
  2020: Distinguished Professor at State University of New York at Buffalo  
  2018: Awarded the   Drake Lectureship at the Congress of Neurological Surgeons
  2018 : "Teacher of the year Award"  by Residents and Fellows at the University at Buffalo Neurosurgery for dedication to teaching and mentoring, given by the Department of Family Medicine, Jacobs School of Medicine and Biomedical Sciences
  2016: Recipient of the L. Nelson Hopkins, MD Professor and Endowed Chair of Neurosurgery Award
  2015: The George Washington University "Distinguished Alumni Achievement Award" for special recognition of professional accomplishments. The "Distinguished Alumni Achievement Award" is one of the most prestigious honors bestowed by the university
  2014: State University of New York "Chancellor's Award" for Excellence in Scholarship and Creative Activities
  2014: Recipient of the "2014 Hero of the Heart" Award for the American Heart Association in Western New York. Recognized as a "world renowned physician'.  Given to community members who help spread the American Heart Association's lifesaving mission

Research 

Levy has helped   the endovascular treatment modalities for stroke. His research work focuses on neurovascular diseases such as stroke, brain aneurysms and vessel malformations. He has published and lectured extensively on the endovascular techniques for cerebrovascular disorders, publishing over 600  peer-reviewed publications and more than 200 book chapters, including his latest book titled "Video Atlas of Acute Ischemic Stroke Intervention". He has also contributed several live cases for national and international meetings as well as for community education.

He has been involved with research resulting in paradigm shifts in the treatment of cerebrovascular diseases, including being the US Interventional Principal Investigator  for the SWIFT PRIME trials. Levy's research work holds an H-index of 90.

Selected publications
A partial list of articles is provided below:

  Thrombectomy 6 to 24 Hours after Stroke with Mismatch between Deficit and Infarct
 Safety and Efficacy of a 3-Dimensional Stent Retriever With Aspiration-Based Thrombectomy vs Aspiration-Based Thrombectomy Alone in Acute Ischemic Stroke Intervention: A Randomized Clinical Trial
 Results of the ANSWER Trial using the PulseRider for the Treatment of Broad-Necked, Bifurcation Aneurysms
 Long-Term Clinical and Angiographic Outcomes Following Pipeline Embolization Device Treatment of Complex Internal Carotid Artery Aneurysms: Five-Year Results of the Pipeline for Uncoilable or Failed Aneurysms Trial
 Endovascular Thrombectomy After Large-Vessel Ischaemic Stroke: A Meta-Analysis of Individual Patient Data from Five Randomised Trials
 Safety and Efficacy of Solitaire Stent Thrombectomy: Individual Patient Data Meta-analysis of Randomized Trials
 Stent-Retriever Thrombectomy after Intravenous t-PA vs. t-PA Alone in Stroke
 Aggressive Medical Treatment With or Without Stenting in High-risk Patients with Intracranial Artery Stenosis (SAMMPRIS):  The Final Results of a Randomised Trial
  Pipeline for Uncoilable or Failed Aneurysms: Results from a Multicenter Clinical Trial
 Solitaire Flow Restoration Device versus the Merci Retriever in Acute Ischaemic Stroke (SWIFT): A Randomized, Parallel-Group, Non-Inferiority Trial
  Stenting versus Aggressive Medical Therapy for Intracranial Arterial Stenosis

Selected Academic Books

Dr. Levy has published extensively on neurovascular diseases including this three part series highlighting Decision making and providing video examples of complex neurovascular procedures and stroke intervention techniques

Decision Making in Neurovascular Disease 
Video Atlas of Neuroendovascular Procedures 
Video Atlas of Acute Ischemic Stroke Intervention

References 

Living people
1972 births
American neurosurgeons
Dartmouth College alumni
George Washington University School of Medicine & Health Sciences alumni
State University of New York Upstate Medical University faculty
Northeastern University alumni